Machinak (also Romanized as Machīnak; also known as Mīchīnak and Mīchītak) is a village in Bayat Rural District, Nowbaran District, Saveh County, Markazi Province, Iran. At the 2006 census, its population was 121, in 38 families.

References 

Populated places in Saveh County